Monumento a los héroes de El Polvorín can refer to either:

 Monumento a los héroes de El Polvorín (obelisk), an obelisk at Plaza Las Delicias, Ponce, Puerto Rico
 Monumento a los héroes de El Polvorín (mausoleum), a mausoleum at Ponce Civil Cemetery, in Ponce, Puerto Rico